The 2020 Copa del Rey Final was a football match that decided the winner of the 2019–20 Copa del Rey, the 118th edition of Spain's primary football cup (including two seasons where two rival editions were played). The match was played at the Estadio de La Cartuja in Seville between Athletic Bilbao and Real Sociedad, the first Basque derby final. 

Originally scheduled for 18 April 2020, the match was postponed with the agreement of the participating clubs on 11 March (with no new date decided at that point) due to the COVID-19 pandemic, which had led to football matches being cancelled or played behind closed doors as a measure to prevent the spread of the virus, in the hope that the delay would provide time to contain the outbreak and allow the final to take place with a full stadium as in normal circumstances. The final was played on 3 April 2021, despite earlier press rumours that had suggested it would be a day later.

Real Sociedad won the final 1–0 thanks to a second-half penalty converted by Mikel Oyarzabal, achieving their third overall Copa del Rey title and first since 1987, ending a 34-year trophy drought.

Background
Real Sociedad were competing in their eighth Copa del Rey final, having lost their last final in 1988 to Barcelona. Athletic Bilbao were competing in their 38th final, having lost their last final in 2015, also to Barcelona. In reaching the final, both teams were assured qualification for the four-team 2020–21 Supercopa de España; this four-team competition was played in January 2021 and won by Athletic.

In the 1910 Copa del Rey (which had two rival tournaments running in parallel), the two clubs participated in the three-team group of the UECF competition along with Madrid FC. The decisive match was between the Basque teams (Athletic winning 1–0), but as it was not a final in the traditional knockout format and the newly-formed Real Sociedad were playing under the name 'Vasconia' for licensing reasons, it was not widely recognised as an equivalent to their meeting 110 years later.

350-day delay
Around the time of the original date for the final, the Spanish football federation (RFEF) had indicated they would grant the designated Europa League group stage berth, typically given to the winners of the tournament, to Athletic Bilbao (10th position in La Liga at the time of its suspension with eleven rounds remaining) should the match not be played within the period of 2019–20, as Real Sociedad (4th place) seemed likely to qualify for at least the Europa League and possibly the Champions League via their league position. However, on 30 April, UEFA stated that the final must be played by 3 August to activate the designated qualification place, otherwise this would revert to the team finishing seventh in La Liga (either with the fixtures completed or the standings declared). Due to the COVID-19 pandemic, it would be very unlikely that any final played by then would allow spectators into the stadium, a factor both clubs had declared was essential when it was initially postponed. Athletic submitted a formal protest against UEFA's instruction, and on 4 May both teams officially reiterated their stance to delay the match until such a time as supporters would be able to attend it.

When the league resumed in June 2020, the form of both clubs was poor: Athletic Bilbao collected 14 points from 33 available, while Real Sociedad gained only 10 points and slipped down the table; however, five of those came in the last three matchdays, including one from an 88th-minute equaliser against Atlético Madrid on the final day to keep them just above Granada and Getafe – they finished sixth and qualified for the Europa League group stage, the same status as would have been afforded the Copa winner. Athletic's challenge had already fallen short and they placed eleventh.

Route to the final

Real Sociedad played in eight matches in the competition (including the final), winning each of them without needing extra time or penalties to progress on any occasion, the run including a dramatic away victory over Real Madrid at the quarter-final stage.

Key: (H) = Home; (A) = Away

Match

Details

Notes

References

2020
Sports competitions in Seville
21st century in Seville
2019–20 in Spanish football
2019–20 in Spanish football cups
April 2021 sports events in Spain
Athletic Bilbao matches
Real Sociedad matches
Association football events postponed due to the COVID-19 pandemic
2021 in Andalusia